Epimactis is a genus of moths in the family Lecithoceridae.

Species
 Epimactis albipunctella Viette, 1968
 Epimactis atropunctella (Walsingham, 1881)
 Epimactis crambalea Meyrick, 1910
 Epimactis crocella Viette, 1956
 Epimactis dissecta Meyrick, 1921
 Epimactis icterina Meyrick, 1931
 Epimactis incertella Viette, 1956
 Epimactis infulata Meyrick, 1914
 Epimactis melithorax Meyrick, 1923
 Epimactis metazona Meyrick, 1908
 Epimactis monodoxa Meyrick, 1907
 Epimactis nigricella Viette, 1968
 Epimactis ochreocapitella Viette, 1968
 Epimactis pulsatella Bradley, 1961
 Epimactis spasmodes Meyrick, 1914
 Epimactis strombodes Meyrick, 1914
 Epimactis suffusella (Walker, 1864)
 Epimactis talantias Meyrick, 1908
 Epimactis tortricella Viette, 1968
 Epimactis turbida Meyrick, 1914

References

Natural History Museum Lepidoptera genus database

 
Lecithoceridae